Golf with Your Friends is a golf video game by Australian developer Blacklight Interactive and published by Team17. The game started in early access on Steam on 30 January 2016 and fully released on 19 May 2020 for Microsoft Windows, Nintendo Switch, PlayStation 4 and Xbox One, and on Google Stadia on 14 April 2022.

Gameplay

Golf With Your Friends allows up to 12 players to play in 13 challenging levels containing 18 holes each, 234 in total. The game features a level editor and ball customizations. A featured The Escapists and Worms map are available in the game.

Development and release
Golf with Your Friends was developed by Brisbane-based video game studio Blacklight Interactive, which consists of three people, and published by Team17. The game started in early access on 30 January 2016. It fully released on 24 May 2020 for Microsoft Windows, Nintendo Switch, PlayStation 4 and Xbox One.

Reception

Golf with Your Friends received "mixed or average" reviews, according to review aggregator Metacritic.

The game scored a 9 out of 10 from Lyle Carr of GodIsAGeek.com, which was the highest score the game received. He thought that golf fans would fall in love with the game, especially with "outlandish levels" and "chaotic game modes".

J. Brodie Shirey of Screen Rant gave the game four stars out of maximum five, "Excellent". While he admitted Golf with Your Friends might have "minor faults", he described the game as "fun" and "colorful". He also praised the in-game physics was "quite well for the most part", feeling satisfied with the varieties in terms of courses and game types.

Richard Dobson of The Xbox Hub sent out a 3.5-star review. He praised the game presented a new experience with "tons of customisation" and "very well-designed courses", as well as excellent to replay. However, he felt the game had some camera issues and small bugs to be fixed.

A.J. Maciejewski wrote a review at Videochums.com based on his knowledge of the Xbox One version, rating 4.9 points of possible 10 to the game, which was the lowest score the game received. He thought the game was "promising", but he criticised the "extremely barebones" gameplay, a lack of characters and glitches the game had.

References

External links 

 

2020 video games
Casual games
Golf video games
Multiplayer and single-player video games
Nintendo Switch games
PlayStation 4 games
Video games developed in Australia
Windows games
Xbox Cloud Gaming games
Xbox One games
Team17 games
Stadia games